Aeolostoma is a genus of moths belonging to the subfamily Tortricinae of the family Tortricidae.

Species
Aeolostoma melanostoecha Diakonoff, 1953
Aeolostoma orophila Diakonoff, 1953
Aeolostoma scutiferana (Meyrick, 1881)

See also
List of Tortricidae genera

References

External links
tortricidae.com

Tortricidae genera
Epitymbiini